Clóvis Frainer O.F.M. Cap. (March 23, 1931 – April 4, 2017) was a Roman Catholic archbishop.

Ordained to the priesthood in 1958, Frainer served as bishop of the Diocese of Coxim, Brazil from 1978 to 1984. He then served as archbishop of the Archdiocese of Manaus from 1985 to 1991. Frainer then served as archbishop of the Archdiocese of Juiz de Fora from 1991 to 2001.

See also
Catholic Church in Brazil

Notes

1931 births
2017 deaths
20th-century Roman Catholic archbishops in Brazil
Roman Catholic archbishops of Juiz de Fora
Roman Catholic archbishops of Manaus
Roman Catholic bishops of Coxim
Capuchin bishops